The Izvorul Dorului is a right tributary of the river Prahova in Romania. It discharges into the Prahova in Sinaia.

Tributaries

The following rivers are tributaries to the river Izvorul Dorului (from source to mouth):

Left: Jepii Mari, Valea Călugărului, Vâlcelul Vârful cu Dor, Valea Uscată, Pârâul Lupului, Valea cu Pietriș, Valea Dracilor, Valea Stânei
Right: Vâlcelul Clinului, Izvorașu, Pârâul Negru, Valea Secăriei

References

Rivers of Romania
Rivers of Prahova County